161 Maiden Lane (also known as One Seaport, 1 Seaport, or Seaport Residences) is a 670 ft (205 m) tall residential skyscraper on hold in the Financial District of Manhattan, New York City. The building leans  to the north as a result of the method used to construct its foundation. Overlooking the East River, the building topped out in September 2018. , only half of the finishes, including windows, have been installed.

History

Site acquisition 
As early as 2007, Bluerock Properties had proposed a 52-story building at 161 Maiden Lane, near the shore of the East River, in the Financial District of Lower Manhattan in New York City. The tower would have been designed by Rogers Marvel Architects.

In 2011, Kay Development bought the site for $41.17 million. The company had planned to develop a 40-story building, the Seaborne, on the site; the building would have contained 175 apartments. This structure would have been designed by John Fotiadis. Kay Development placed the land for sale in May 2013. Fortis Property Group bought the site at 151–161 Maiden Lane in September 2013, paying $64 million for the  lot.

Construction 
Construction of the building, then known as One Seaport Residences, began in July 2015. Jack Resnick & Sons, which owned the similarly named One Seaport Plaza at 199 Water Street, sued Fortis for trademark infringement that September. The two firms came to an agreement in December 2015, when Fortis agreed to market the building using the numeral version of the name, 1 Seaport, for a limited period. After that period had ended, Fortis could not market the building as either "One Seaport" or "1 Seaport". Fortis submitted a condominium offering plan for the building to the New York Real Estate Finance Bureau, which approved the plan in late February 2016. Fortis estimated that it would be able to sell 80 condos for a total of $272 million.

Condo sales launched in April 2016, with the cheapest condos being offered for $1.2 million. Twenty percent of the units were in contract within one day. At the time, the structure was supposed to open in early 2018. Swedish real estate broker Fredrik Eklund was among the earliest condominium buyers, acquiring a duplex on the 46th and 47th floors. Bank Leumi USA, a subsidiary of Bank Leumi, gave Fortis a $90 million construction loan for the property in June 2016. To attract buyers, Fortis announced a partnership with Hinckley Yachts in late 2016, renting three luxury yachts to condominium owners. Under the terms of its condo offering plan, Fortis was to have finalized the first condo sales in January 2018. If Fortis had failed to finalize any contracts by June 2018, the developer had to provide an updated budget; buyers could renege from their contracts if the project had overrun its $273 million budget by at least 25 percent.

Controversies and delays 
Between January and September 2017, the New York City Department of Buildings (DOB) issued 10 building-code violations to the project's general contractor Pizzarotti. An employee of SSC High Rise, the project's concrete subcontractor, died in September 2017 after falling from the building's 29th floor. Investigators determined that the employee's safety harness had been jammed in a scaffolding platform, which was then jolted, causing him to fall to his death. Following the incident, the project was halted indefinitely; at the time, two-thirds of the condos had gone into contract. Work resumed in December 2017 but experienced further issues the next month, when the DOB issued two stop-work orders due to incorrectly installed construction netting. Construction was paused again after a concrete bucket hit the 34th floor, poured concrete onto the street, and lifted part of the 34th-story deck.

By January 2018, Fortis planned to obtain $185 million in construction financing for 161 Maiden Lane. Pizzarotti fired SSC in April 2018 after further incidents and delays, hiring RC Structures. SSC pleaded guilty to manslaughter in July 2018. The building topped out during September 2018. The same month, Mack Real Estate gave Fortis a $66 million mezzanine loan for the property. At the time, potential buyers had signed contracts for 72 of the building's 98 condominiums.

Pizzarotti sued Fortis in March 2019 over the fact that the building was leaning  to its north. By then, Pizzarotti was no longer employed as the general contractor. According to local website New York YIMBY, work on the building had been halted for several months. The contractor alleged that Fortis had constructed the foundation using a soil improvement method, where chemicals or other material are added to the soil to strengthen it, rather than the piling method like other neighboring skyscrapers. Pizzarotti claimed that the building had settled unevenly, causing it to tilt; a subcontractor first noticed the issue in April 2018. Pizzarotti claimed that it had difficulties installing the glass curtain wall because of the building's lean and that a continued lean would result in non-functioning windows, faulty elevators, and bad waterproofing. Fortis filed a countersuit that May, blaming Pizzarotti for not properly surveying the construction site and for failing to ensure workers' safety. The developer hired engineering firms WSP Global and Arup Group, which concluded that the building's lean did not compromise the building's structural integrity. Ray Builders, which replaced Pizzarotti as general contractor, designed a glass curtain wall that accommodated the lean.

Work halts 
Ray Builders stopped working on the project in July 2020, claiming that Fortis had failed to pay its workers, and subsequently resigned as general contractor the next year. Fortis sued Bank Leumi in August 2020, claiming that the bank had failed to distribute part of the loan as scheduled. Bank Leumi had placed the project's $120 million construction loan for sale in October 2020, and the bank was foreclosing on the loan by the end of that year. Due to the continuing delays, by February 2021, all except six of the condo buyers had reneged from their contracts. In addition, because the upper stories had not yet been enclosed, they were vulnerable to temperature changes and weather. A state judge appointed a receiver to secure the site in May 2021, as the lawsuits proceeded. Engel Burman Construction was hired to secure the construction site.

Bank Leumi and Fortis agreed to mediation in August 2021. Both the lender and the developer had withdrawn from mediation by March 2022, when a lawyer for Bank Leumi said the "parties were too far apart in discussions to reach any resolution". That September, Mack Real Estate sued Fortis, as well as Harel Insurance Company and Valley National Bank, which had acquired Bank Leumi's United States division. Mack claimed that Harel and Bank Leumi had fraudulently misused the $66 million mezzanine loan that Mack had placed on the project. The project remains halted as of November 2022.

Architecture 
The building was designed by Hill West Architects and interior designer Groves & Co. According to The Wall Street Journal, 161 Maiden Lane's design includes a porte-cochère and a glass curtain wall. In addition, the building is planned to have a health club with a spa, fitness center, and infinity pool. The 60-story structure rises 670 ft (205 m). It would have  of space, including 80 residential condominiums. Plans also call for the building to contain 17 storage units, which would be sold to residents.

References

External links

Residential buildings in Manhattan
Financial District, Manhattan
Unfinished buildings and structures in the United States